William Whitney may refer to:

William Channing Whitney (1851–1945), American architect
William Collins Whitney (1841–1904), American politician, financier, founder of the prominent Whitney family, US Secretary of the Navy
William Dwight Whitney (1827–1894), American linguist, philologist, and lexicographer who edited The Century Dictionary
William M. Whitney (1828–?), American politician, member of Illinois House of Representatives
William Fiske Whitney (1850–1921), American anatomist, curator, and pathologist
William G. Whitney (1840–1915), American Medal of Honor recipient
Payne Whitney (William Payne Whitney, 1876–1927), American businessman, philanthropist, racehorse breeder and owner

See also
Bill Whitney (Willard Whitney), U.S. journalist
William Witney (1915–2002), American director of serials and westerns sometimes billed as William Whitney